Family worship, sometimes simply family prayer, is prayer, bible reading, and singing of psalms and hymns conducted in private homes usually by Reformed Christians. During the Protestant Reformation, daily mass services were simplified in order to allow wider participation by laypeople. In the seventeenth century, it became more common especially in England and Scotland to emphasize daily morning and evening services in the home led by fathers to replace the morning and evening prayer services. Puritan minister Richard Baxter gave lengthy instructions in his Christian Directory for family worship. The General Assembly of the Church of Scotland added a chapter to the 1647 Westminster Directory for Worship on family prayer shortly after adoption. Matthew Henry also wrote on family worship in his A Method for Prayer, as well as a collection of psalms and canticles for family use called Family Hymns. James W. Alexander, son of Princeton theologian Archibald Alexander wrote Thoughts on Family Worship in the nineteenth century. The rise of pietism saw a decline in the importance placed on the unity of the family, and family devotions were by and large replaced with private devotions, which were significantly shorter than traditional family worship. Small group activities are also sometimes considered a replacement for family worship. In the Malankara Orthodox Syrian Church, the Book of Common Prayer or Shehimo is used by the families for daily prayers outside of church.

See also
 Reformed worship

References

Protestant worship and liturgy
Christian prayer